Charlie Dibbs (3 April 1905 – 22 November 1960) was an Australian rules footballer who played for the Collingwood Magpies in the Victorian Football League (VFL) during the 1920s and 1930s.

Charlie Dibbs was born Charles William Heaton in Carlton in 1905, the son of William George Heaton and Elizabeth (née Hodge). He took the Dibbs surname after his mother remarried following his father's death.

Most of Dibb's football career was spent at fullback and he was a member of the Collingwood side which won four consecutive premierships. Dibbs kicked his only goal in his 4th match, his remaining 219 games is the longest goalless streak in VFL/AFL history.

He finished his career with a season as captain-coach of Geelong in 1936.

Dibbs was Collingwood life member and in 2007 he was inducted into the Magpies' Hall of Fame.

References

External links

1905 births
1960 deaths
Collingwood Football Club players
Collingwood Football Club Premiership players
Geelong Football Club players
Geelong Football Club coaches
Latrobe Football Club players
Australian rules footballers from Melbourne
Five-time VFL/AFL Premiership players
People from Carlton, Victoria